Martin Schumnig (born July 28, 1989) is an Austrian professional ice hockey defenceman who is currently playing with Black Wings Linz of the ICE Hockey League (ICEHL). He has spent the majority of his playing career with EC KAC of his native Austria.

On August 21, 2013, Schumnig was signed his first North American contract, signing with the Cincinnati Cyclones of the ECHL, however, just prior to opening the 2013–14 season, Schumnig was released from his contract and returned to Klagenfurt on October 18, 2013.

Following the first 16 seasons of his career exclusively with EC KAC, Schumnig opted to continue his career by signing a one-year deal with fellow Austrian ICEHL club, Black Wings Linz, on 26 April 2022.

International
Schumnig participated at the 2011 and 2013 IIHF World Championships as a member of the Austria men's national ice hockey team.

References

External links

1989 births
Living people
Austrian ice hockey defencemen
EHC Black Wings Linz players
EC KAC players
Sportspeople from Klagenfurt